Boris Hvoynev (born 19 August 1967) is a former Bulgarian footballer who played as a forward. He spent more than a decade with Botev Plovdiv and appeared in over 200 matches in the Bulgarian top league. Hvoynev was capped two times at senior level by the Bulgarian national team.

Career
Considered a Botev Plovdiv legend, where he spent the vast majority of his playing career, Hvoynev also represented Loko Sofia, CSKA Sofia and Maritsa Plovdiv. Outside of Bulgaria, he donned the shirt of Alki (Cyprus) and La Valletta (Malta), becoming champion with the latter. In 2005, Hvoynev relocated to Baltimore, United States, where he has been coaching youth teams.

Honours
Valletta
Maltese Premier League: 1998–99

References

External links

1967 births
Living people
Bulgarian footballers
Bulgaria international footballers
Botev Plovdiv players
PFC CSKA Sofia players
FC Lokomotiv 1929 Sofia players
Alki Larnaca FC players
Valletta F.C. players
First Professional Football League (Bulgaria) players
Expatriate footballers in Cyprus
Expatriate footballers in Malta
Bulgarian expatriate footballers
Association football forwards
People from Smolyan